Karo (official spelling: KARO) is a German brand of filterless cigarettes, currently owned and manufactured by Altria (previously by Philip Morris International). Karo is the german word for "diamond" (a suit of cards).

History
KARO was originally launched as Carré in the early 1960s, but was later "Germanised" into "KARO".

KARO cigarettes were formerly produced in East Germany by the "VEB Zigarettenfabriken Dresden", and because it was produced in the German Democratic Republic, the cigarette was made only from tobacco without added perfumes, fragrances and flavour enhancers.

A pack of filterless KARO cigarettes sold for 1.60 M per box of 20 cigarettes, which made it one of the cheapest cigarettes on the Eastern market.

In East Germany, the cigarettes had been nicknamed "Lungentorpedo" ("Lung torpedo") on the basis of their unique and strong taste. KARO-smokers often objected to jokes because of it.

In East-Germany, the cigarette was widespread, especially among prison inmates. In West-Germany, the brand was hardly sold because it was difficult to obtain.

After the German reunification, the brand was advertised with the slogan that it was an "attack on the taste of the unification".

In popular culture
Wolfgang Lippert sang it in 1982 in his hit Erna kommt ("Erna comes"), with Hugo Egon Balder's western cover version simply changing the words "a check" to "cigarette". The brand was also smoked by Jürgen Wolff from "Folkländer" and Bernd Stamm from "Polkatoffel". The brand was especially popular in the East German Folk music scene.

See also
 Tobacco smoking
 Caballero (cigarette)
 Mantano (cigarette)

References

Philip Morris brands